Gagarinskiy District is an administrative raion (district) of the city of Sevastopol, named after cosmonaut Yuri Gagarin. Population:

See also
Subdivisions of Russia
Subdivisions of Ukraine

References

Urban districts of Sevastopol
Monuments and memorials to Yuri Gagarin